Maaike Smit (7 August 1966, in Emmeloord) is a Dutch former professional wheelchair tennis and wheelchair basketball player. 

Smit started wheelchair tennis at the age of 20. She played at the US Open and Australian Open, and won the Florida Open International Wheelchair Tennis Championship 4 times. 

In 1996, Smit won a gold medal in  the singles wheelchair event at the 1996 Atlanta Paralympics. She also won two gold medals in doubles at the 2000 Sydney and the 2004 Athens Paralympics. 

She was sponsored by Invacare, a company that produces wheelchairs and other equipment for disabled people.

References

External links 
 Interview with Maaike Smit (2008)
 

1966 births
Living people
Dutch female tennis players
Wheelchair tennis players
People from Emmeloord
People with paraplegia
Sportspeople from Noordoostpolder
Paralympic gold medalists for the Netherlands
Paralympic wheelchair tennis players of the Netherlands
Dutch women's wheelchair basketball players
Wheelchair basketball players at the 1988 Summer Paralympics
Wheelchair basketball players at the 1992 Summer Paralympics
Wheelchair tennis players at the 1996 Summer Paralympics
Wheelchair tennis players at the 2000 Summer Paralympics
Wheelchair tennis players at the 2004 Summer Paralympics
Medalists at the 1996 Summer Paralympics
Medalists at the 2000 Summer Paralympics
Medalists at the 2004 Summer Paralympics
Medalists at the 1988 Summer Paralympics
Paralympic bronze medalists for the Netherlands
Medalists at the 1992 Summer Paralympics
Paralympic medalists in wheelchair tennis
Paralympic medalists in wheelchair basketball